Amy Timmel Hogue is an American, former collegiate All-American, professional softball second basemen and current head coach at Utah. Hogue played college softball at Utah and led them to two Women's College Word Series appearances. Hogue as a freshman player set the NCAA Division I single game record for at-bats (14) on May 11, 1991, during the longest game in NCAA softball history.

Career
Hogue played college softball at Utah from 1991 to 1994 and led them to two Women's College Word Series appearances to bookend her career and was named the 1994 Western Athletic Conference Player of the Year. She is the current head coach at Utah. Hogue as a freshman player set the NCAA Division I single game record for at-bats (14) on May 11, 1991, during the longest game in NCAA softball history.

Coaching career

Utah
On May 24, 2007, Amy Hogue was announced as the new head coach of the Utah softball program. She has mentored athletes such as Hannah Flippen and Anissa Urtez. She also guided the Utes to two back-to-back NCAA Super Regional appearances in 2016-17.

Statistics

Utah Utes

Head coaching record

College

References

Living people
Utah Utes softball players
Utah Utes softball coaches
Softball players from Utah
Female sports coaches
American softball coaches
Salt Lake Bruins softball coaches
Year of birth missing (living people)